Haiduk Peak is a  peak, probably after Haiduk, district, Hungary or Hideghut (Haiduk), village of Rumania. Haiduk Peak is located on the Continental Divide on the border of Banff and Kootenay National Parks at the head of Haiduk Creek. The mountain was named in 1917, probably after the Haiduks of the Balkans. The name was adopted on 31 December 1928.

References

External links
 Geographic board of Canada

Two-thousanders of Alberta
Two-thousanders of British Columbia
Canadian Rockies